Chanopsis is an extinct genus of prehistoric bony fish that lived during the Aptian stage of the Early Cretaceous epoch.

See also

Prehistoric fish
List of prehistoric bony fish

References

Early Cretaceous fish
Cretaceous bony fish
Prehistoric bony fish genera